is a 1964 Japanese action film directed by Takumi Furukawa.

This film was made available in North America when Janus Films released a special set of Nikkatsu studio's Noir films as part of The Criterion Collection, also including I Am Waiting, Rusty Knife, Take Aim at the Police Van, and A Colt Is My Passport.

Cast 
 Joe Shishido - Togawa
 Chieko Matsubara - Rie
 Tamio Kawaji - Takizawa
 Shōbun Inoue - Okada
 Yuji Odaka - Shirai
 Minako Kazuki - Keiko
 Hiroshi Nihonyanagi - Matsumoto
 Hiroshi Kondo - Kondo
 Saburo Hiromatsu - Saeki
 Junichi Yamanobe - Yanagida

Plot
A wealthy Yakuza boss has arranged for the early prison release of Togawa, played by Joe Shishido, who has been serving time for having taken revenge on the man whose reckless driving has consigned his sister, Rei, to a wheelchair.  Togawa has no chance to go straight as he is immediately coerced by the mob boss into organizing the hijacking of an armored car carrying 127 million yen in racetrack proceeds. The crime boss promises Togawa a cut which will allow Togawa to pay for surgery to help his sister to walk. After assembling a ragtag crew to undertake the robbery, Togawa must now pull off the hijacking and navigate through unanticipated developments and a series of double crosses arising from all sides.

References

External links 

Cruel Gun Story at Turner Classic Movies

1960s action films
Yakuza films
1960s Japanese films